The 2014 Ottawa Fury FC season was the club's first season in the North American Soccer League.

Background

Marc Dos Santos became the first head coach of the club on July 1, 2013.

Squad

Friendlies

Pre-season

Mid-season

Competitions

NASL Spring season

Spring season review
The Spring season saw Fury FC give a sturdy account of themselves on their NASL debut, as the club went 3-1-5 while never losing a match by more than two goals.  Vini Dantas scored the first goal in club history on April 19, 2014, in a 2-1 defeat against Minnesota United.  The first victory in club history came the following weekend, as Ottawa blew out the visiting Carolina RailHawks 4-0 on April 26.  Fury FC also picked up victories against expansion brethren Indy Eleven (4-2) and established Canadian rivals FC Edmonton (1-0), while picking up a draw at home against Tampa Bay Rowdies.  While Fury FC lost a pair of matches on home turf at the final minute, the club still sat in a respectable sixth place out of ten at the culmination of the Spring season, just four points behind the final playoff spot.

Standings

Results summary

Results by round

Match reports

NASL Fall season

Fall season review
The Fall season saw plenty of ups and downs for Fury FC.  French goalkeeper Romuald Peiser joined the club in early July, and turned in multiple Man-of-the-Match performances during the Fall campaign.  Opening day of the Fall season saw Ottawa draw 0-0 in Edmonton against their Canadian rivals on a sweltering day, and the ruing of missed opportunities was a foreshadowing of things to come.  Fury FC christened their new home, TD Place Stadium, the following weekend, and despite setting a modern-day NASL record in attendance, Ottawa fell 1-0 to the defending Soccer Bowl champion New York Cosmos on a Sebastián Guenzatti goal. 
Ottawa stumbled out of the gate, opening the second portion of the NASL schedule with a six-game winless skid which saw them tumble out of the playoff picture.  The team's second trip to Indianapolis, where they'd won already in the spring, was just what the doctor ordered, as Fury FC picked up their first win of the fall campaign on August 23, edging the Eleven 2-1.  That victory over Indy would kickstart a good run of form for Dos Santos' side, as Ottawa went on a 4-2-2 run which saw them somewhat claw their way back into the playoff picture.
Unfortunately for Fury FC the workhorses in the side gave out in the final weeks of the campaign, and the club ended the season on a disappointing 0-1-3 slide which saw them slide to a disappointing ninth-place finish in the fall table.
The fall season saw certain players emerge as cornerstones for the inaugural iteration of the squad; young Mauro Eustaquio emerged from the reserves to make a few starts towards the end of the season, while captain Richie Ryan solidified his role in the heart of the Fury FC midfield.   Oliver Minatel battled back from multiple injuries to become a creative force on the flank of what was, in certain matches, a very potent Fury FC attack, while Romuald Peiser proved to be one of the best signings of the club's debut season, providing veteran leadership and timely stops in goal.

Standings

Results summary

Results by round

Match reports

NASL Combined season

Standings

Results summary

Results by round

Canadian Championship

Canadian Championship review
Fury FC's debut in the  Canadian Championship was short-lived, as the club was bounced from the competition in the first round by fellow NASL side  FC Edmonton, losing 3-1 to the Eddies on aggregate.

The first leg saw the two sides play to a 0-0 draw in the nation's capital, though both managers felt their sides had ample opportunities to win.

The second leg, a week later in Edmonton, saw the Eddies bully a visibly tired Fury FC all over the pitch.   Daryl Fordyce opened the scoring for the hosts with a clean finish in the 30th minute, and a Hanson Boakai goal just three minutes into the second half effectively put the match to bed.  Fordyce put the proverbial nail in Fury FC's coffin in the 64th, while  Vini Dantas scored a consolation goal in injury time for Ottawa.

All things considered, it wasn't a disastrous or entirely unexpected result for Marc Dos Santos' expansion side, but the club's early exit from the competition left the club hungry for another crack at the domestic cup in 2015.

Preliminary round

Squad statistics

Appearances and Goals

|-
|colspan="14"|Players who appeared for Ottawa but left during the season:

|}

Goal scorers

Transfers

In

Out

Awards

Player

Notes
1.Kickoff time in Eastern time.
2.Ottawa Fury goals listed first.

References

Ottawa Fury Football Club
Ottawa Fury Football Club
Ottawa Fury FC seasons
Ottawa Fury